Dominique Bona (born 29 July 1953 in Perpignan) is a French writer.

Life
She won the 2000 Bourse Goncourt for biography, and 1998 Prix Renaudot.
She was literary critic for Le Figaro  and Le Journal du dimanche.

She was elected a member of Académie française in April 2013.

She is the daughter of Arthur Conte and Colette Lacassagne.

References 

1953 births
Living people
French biographers
Members of the Académie Française
Prix Renaudot winners
Prix Goncourt de la Biographie winners
Officiers of the Légion d'honneur
Officiers of the Ordre des Arts et des Lettres
Officers of the Ordre national du Mérite
Prix Interallié winners
People from Perpignan
20th-century French women writers
21st-century French women writers
Women biographers